Manuel Escudero Zamora (born 1946) is a Spanish economist and politician.

Biography 
Escudero was born on 29 March 1946 in San Sebastián, Gipuzkoa. He graduated from Business Sciences at the Universidad de Deusto, and obtained a PhD at the London School of Economics. Between 1987 and 1991, he worked as coordinator of the "Programa 2000" of the Spanish Socialist Workers' Party (PSOE). He was professor of Macroeconomics at the IE Business School in Madrid between 1991 and 2005 as well as the director of the Global Compact Research Center at the Levin Institute. Linked within the PSOE to the figure of Josep Borrell, in 2003 he became a member of the Congress of Deputies representing Madrid, covering the vacant seat left by José Quintana Viar. Escudero, who later took a step back from the political activity, returned to the PSOE and was appointed secretary responsible for the Area of Economic Policy and Employment of the PSOE.

Following the accession of Pedro Sánchez to the post of Prime Minister in June 2018, Escudero was appointed Chief Ambassador of the Spanish Delegation to the Organisation for Economic Co-operation and Development (OECD), replacing José Ignacio Wert.

References 

Living people
Members of the 7th Congress of Deputies (Spain)
Spanish economists
Ambassadors of Spain to the Organisation for Economic Co-operation and Development
1946 births